There are more than 9000 Grade I listed buildings in England. This page is a list of these buildings in the district of Torbay in Devon.

Torbay

|}

Notes

External links

Lists of Grade I listed buildings in Devon
Grade I